Gabriel Silva Luján (born 5 October 1957) is a Colombian diplomat and political scientist who served as the 33rd and 27th Ambassador of Colombia to the United States. He has also served as Minister of National Defence and as General Manager of the National Federation of Coffee Growers of Colombia.

Background
Gabriel Silva Luján was born in Barranquilla on 5 October 1957. After completing his secondary education at the Colegio San Carlos and graduating with a degree in political science with a concentration in economics from the University of the Andes in Bogotá, Silva travelled to the United States where he completed his graduate studies in Economics and International Relations at the Paul H. Nitze School of Advanced International Studies of Johns Hopkins University in Washington D.C. under a Ford Foundation fellowship grant.

Career

Silva was named Ambassador to the United States by the President-elect Juan Manuel Santos on 27 July 2010 during an official visit to lima, Peru during Santos's pre-inauguration international tour. His appointment was interpreted as a reiteration of Colombia's security concerns going forward: "I believe that the purpose of my appointment is a clear signal that security and defence issues in bilateral relations with the United States are still very important," Silva told reporters.

Works

Collaborations
 
 Silva Luján, Gabriel in 
 "El Origen del frente Nacional y el Gobierno de la Junta Militar" [The Origins of the National Front and the Government of the Military Junta]. pp 179–210.
 "Lleras Camargo y Valencia: Entre El Reformismo y La Represión" [Lleras Camargo and Valencia: Between Reformism and Repression]. pp 211–236.
 "Carlos Lleras y Misael Pastrana: Reformas del Estado y Crisis del Frente Nacional" [Carlos Lleras and Misael Pastrana: State Reforms and Crisis of the National Front]. pp 237–262.

References

1957 births
Living people
People from Barranquilla
Colombian Ministers of Defense
Ambassadors of Colombia to the United States
Colombian political scientists
Paul H. Nitze School of Advanced International Studies alumni
University of Los Andes (Colombia) alumni